Jibacoa, or more properly Playa Jibacoa, is a fishing village in the Mayabeque Province of Cuba. It is located in the municipality of Santa Cruz del Norte, at the mouth of the Jibacoa River, 60 km east of Havana.

The settlement was founded in 1756 on the location of a corral.

See also

Arcos de Canasí
Bacunayagua
Boca de Jaruco
Camilo Cienfuegos (Hershey)

References

External links

 Jibacoa tourist website
 Jibacoa on guije.com

Populated places in Mayabeque Province
Port cities and towns in Cuba
Beaches of Cuba
Populated places established in 1756
1750s establishments in Cuba
1756 establishments in the Spanish West Indies
Climbing areas of Cuba